Santiago García Botta (born 19 June 1992 in Buenos Aires) is an Argentine rugby union player. He plays as a prop.

He played at Belgrano Athletic Club at the Nacional de Clubes. He moved to Stade Français, returning afterwards to Belgrano Athletic Club.

García Botta is a regular player for Argentina Jaguars. He played at the 2015 World Rugby Nations Cup, where the Jaguars were runners-up. He has 6 caps for Argentina, with one try scored, five points on aggregate. His first game was at the 85–10 win over Chile, at 1 May 2013, in Montevideo, for the 2015 Rugby World Cup qualifyings. He scored a try in his international debut.

He was a late call up for the Pumas in the 2015 Rugby World Cup, haven been called up on the 29 October the day before the Bronze final against South Africa. He came on during the 77th minute of the game.

In 2019 he joined English club Harlequins. He was a replacement in the Premiership final against Exeter on 26 June 2021 as Harlequins won the game 40-38 in the highest scoring Premiership final ever.

References

External links

1992 births
Living people
Argentine rugby union players
Argentina international rugby union players
Jaguares (Super Rugby) players
Rugby union props
Rugby union players from Buenos Aires
Stade Français players
Argentine expatriate rugby union players
Expatriate rugby union players in France
Argentine expatriate sportspeople in France